Hayato (written: 勇人, 勇斗, 勇登, 隼, 隼人, 隼斗, 速人, 早人, 早十, 駿斗 or 颯斗) is a masculine Japanese given name. Notable people with the name include:

, Japanese baseball player
, Japanese baseball player
, Japanese footballer
, Japanese anime director
, Japanese professional wrestler
, Japanese footballer
, Japanese actor
, Japanese politician and Prime Minister
, Japanese actor
Hayato Juumonji (born 1967), or Takehito Koyasu, Japanese voice actor
, Japanese sumo wrestler
, Japanese composer
, Japanese footballer
, Japanese footballer
, Japanese footballer
, Japanese footballer
Hayato Okamoto (disambiguation), multiple people
, Japanese footballer
, Japanese actor
, Japanese footballer
, Japanese baseball player
, Japanese mixed martial artist
, Japanese actor and member of boy group M!LK
, Japanese footballer
, Japanese pianist
, Japanese footballer
, Japanese baseball player
, Japanese actor
, Japanese baseball player
, Japanese footballer
, Japanese cyclist
, Japanese sumo wrestler
, Titles: YRH, Lord, SFC-Army Soldier / Half Okinawan, Half German American

Fictional characters
 Hayato or Falkner (Pokémon), a Johto Gym Leader in Pokémon
 Hayato Gokudera, a character in Katekyo Hitman Reborn!  manga and anime
 Hayato Kanzaki, a character in Star Gladiator video game series
 Hayato Honda, a character in Kochikame
 Hayato Ichimonji, a character in Kamen Rider
 Hayato Jin, a character in Getter Robo manga and anime
 Hayato Kamitani, a character in Gakuen Babysitters
 Hayato Kobayashi, a character in Mobile Suit Gundam
 Hayato Maeda or Chumley Huffington, a character in Yu-Gi-Oh! Duel Monsters GX anime
 Hayato Kazami the main character of Future GPX Cyber Formula
 Hayato Nekketsu, a character from the Rival Schools video game series
 Hayato Yabuki, a character in the second season of Gokusen
 Hayato (Flying Dragon), a character in the Nintendo 64 game Flying Dragon
Hayato, a diviner in the Nintendo 3DS game Fire Emblem Fates
Hayato Matatagi, a character in Inazuma Eleven GO Galaxy
 Hayato Izumi, main character in the anime My Wife is the Student Council President
 Hayato Haruki, a character in the video game Yandere Simulator
 Hayato Kawajiri, a side character in Diamond is Unbreakable manga and anime
Hayato Ikejiri, a character in Haikyuu!! manga and anime 
Hayato, a playable character in Smartphone Game Garena Free Fire
Hayato, a character from the manga Metamorphosis

Japanese masculine given names